Warren A. Shibles was an American philosopher, historian and professor. His B.A. is from the University of Connecticut and his M.A. from the University of Colorado. He was head of the department of philosophy of the University of Wisconsin-Whitewater. He is the author of numerous articles in history and philosophy and of many books, including children's books in philosophy and ethics. A number of his books have been translated into German, Finnish and Spanish languages.

Bibliography
Analysis of Metaphor in the Light of W.M. Urban's Theories  Softcover, Language Press, 
Good and Bad Are Funny Things: A Rhyming Book Ethics for Children  Softcover, Language Pr, 
Lying: a Critical Analysis  Hardcover, Language Pr, 
 Metaphor: An Annotated Bibliography and History  Hardcover, Language Pr, 
Rational Love  Softcover, Language Pr, 
Time: A Critical Analysis for Children  Softcover, Language Pr, 
 Death: An Interdisciplinary Analysis  Hardcover, Language Press,    Hardcover, Language Press, 
Emotion in Aesthetics  Hardcover, Kluwer Academic Pub, 
Emotion: The Method of Philosophical Therapy  Hardcover, Language Press,    Hardcover, Language Press, 
Essays on Metaphor  Softcover, Language Press,    Hardcover, Language Press, 
Ethics: A Critical Analysis for Children  Hardcover, Language Press, 
Humor, a Critical Analysis for Young People  Hardcover, Language Press, 
Models of Ancient Greek Philosophy  Hardcover, Vision, 
Philosophical Pictures  Hardcover, Kendall Hunt Pub Co, 
Humor Reference Guide: A Comprehensive Classification and Analysis (Hardcover) 1998 
Wittgenstein Language & Philosophy (Soft cover) Wm. C. Brown Book Co., 1969 ,

In German
Lügen und lügen lassen.  Softcover, 
Ethik für alle. Lermann Verlag, Mainz. 1999.
Was ist Zeit? Lermann Verlag, Mainz. 1997.
Unsere Gefühlswelt. Dr. Gisela Lermann Verlag, Mainz. 1995.

In Finnish
Etiikkaa lapsille ja nuorille. (Ethics, 1978.) Translator: Erkki Hartikainen. Helsinki: Vapaa-ajattelijain liitto ry. 1979.
Emootiot: Lisää etiikkaa lapsille ja nuorille. (Emotion, 1978.) Translator: Erkki Hartikainen. Helsinki: Vapaa-ajattelijain liitto ry. 1979.

See also
 American philosophy
 List of American philosophers

References

American philosophers
American children's writers
University of Connecticut alumni
University of Colorado alumni
Year of birth missing (living people)
Living people
University of Wisconsin–Whitewater faculty
Writers from Wisconsin
American male non-fiction writers